Jerzy Feliks Budnik (born 30 May 1951 in Wejherowo) is a Polish politician. He was elected to the Sejm on 25 September 2005, getting 8,396 votes in 26 Gdynia district as a candidate from the Civic Platform list.

He was also a member of Sejm 1997-2001 and Sejm 2001-2005.

See also
Members of Polish Sejm 2005-2007

External links
Jerzy Budnik - parliamentary page - includes declarations of interest, voting record, and transcripts of speeches.

1951 births
Living people
People from Wejherowo
PAX Association members
Solidarity Electoral Action politicians
Civic Platform politicians
Members of the Polish Sejm 2005–2007
Members of the Polish Sejm 1997–2001
Members of the Polish Sejm 2001–2005
Members of the Polish Sejm 2007–2011
Members of the Polish Sejm 2011–2015